Rory Michael Singer (born May 28, 1976) is an American mixed martial artist and Brazilian Jiu Jitsu Black Belt. Although Rory had made a name for himself as a 185-pound prospect; his big break came after meeting the producers of TUF. They were filming Forrest Griffin at The HardCore Gym for his fight against Stephan Bonnar in the finals of season 1. Forrest went on to win Season 1 and Rory was approached soon after to appear on Season 3.

Mixed martial arts career

Singer has a background in many different styles of fighting, being involved in martial arts since he was 11 years old. He was taught kickboxing by his brother and then added karate, Taekwondo, and other traditional martial arts. He wrestled in high school, and is a former local Golden Gloves and Muay Thai champion. Singer is also a Black Belt in Brazilian Jiu-Jitsu.  He is the co-owner of the noted MMA Gym SBG Athens along with his brother and Brazilian Jiu-Jitsu Black Belt Adam Singer.  The HardCore Gym had produced such fighters as Forrest Griffin and Brian Bowles. Singer's MMA career includes fighting for several local organizations as well as the AFC, KOTC, PRIDE and the UFC.  He gained fame from his appearance on Spike TV's series The Ultimate Fighter 3, making it to the semi-finals where he would lose to Ed Herman.

After a 5-year break from MMA, Singer was scheduled to fight Lodune Sincaid on September 26, 2014.  However, Sincaid was pulled from the fight due to suspension by the California State Athletic Commission. Singer currently resides in Athens, Georgia, where he coaches BJJ, MMA, and Youth Martial Arts for people of all walks of life.

Personal life
Singer married in August 2008. Singer is Jewish. He attended the University of Georgia where he earned a degree in biological engineering.

Mixed martial arts record

|-
| Loss
| align=center| 11–9
| Bryan Baker
| TKO (punches)
| MFC 20
| 
| align=center| 1
| align=center| 4:56
| Edmonton, Alberta, Canada
| 
|-
| Loss
| align=center| 11–8
| Chilo Gonzalez
| Submission (kneebar)
| AFL: Erupption
| 
| align=center| 1
| align=center| N/A
| Lexington, Kentucky, United States
| 
|-
| Loss
| align=center| 11–7
| Jason MacDonald
| TKO (punches)
| UFC 72
| 
| align=center| 2
| align=center| 3:18
| Belfast, Northern Ireland
| 
|-
| Win
| align=center| 11–6
| Matt Masterson
| Decision (unanimous)
| Wild Bill's Fight Night 8 (ISKA)
| 
| align=center| 3
| align=center| 5:00
| Atlanta, Georgia, United States
| 
|-
| Loss
| align=center| 10–6
| Yushin Okami
| Submission (punches)
| UFC 66: Liddell vs. Ortiz
| 
| align=center| 3
| align=center| 4:03
| Las Vegas, Nevada, United States
| 
|-
| Win
| align=center| 10–5
| Josh Haynes
| Decision (unanimous)
| Ortiz vs. Shamrock 3: The Final Chapter
| 
| align=center| 3
| align=center| 5:00
| Hollywood, Florida, United States
| 
|-
| Win
| align=center| 9–5
| Ross Pointon
| Submission (triangle choke)
| The Ultimate Fighter: Team Ortiz vs. Team Shamrock Finale
| 
| align=center| 1
| align=center| 0:44
| Las Vegas, Nevada, United States
| 
|-
| Win
| align=center| 8–5
| Josh Tamsen
| Submission (triangle choke)
| Full Throttle 3
| 
| align=center| 1
| align=center| 1:23
| Georgia, U.S.
| 
|-
| Loss
| align=center| 7–5
| Dennis Hallman
| Submission (rear naked choke)
| Absolute Fighting Champions 11
| 
| align=center| 1
| align=center| N/A
| Fort Lauderdale, Florida, United States
| 
|-
| Win
| align=center| 7–4
| Jason Hathaway
| Submission (rear naked choke)
| ISCF: Domination at the DAC
| 
| align=center| 1
| align=center| 2:06
| Atlanta, Georgia, United States
| 
|-
| Win
| align=center| 6–4
| Diego Vitosky
| Submission (rear naked choke)
| Absolute Fighting Championships 9
| 
| align=center| 1
| align=center| 0:58
| Fort Lauderdale, Florida, United States
| 
|-
| Win
| align=center| 5–4
| Wilson Gouveia
| KO (knee)
| KOTC 32: Bringing Heat
| 
| align=center| 2
| align=center| 4:55
| Miami, Florida, United States
| 
|-
| Win
| align=center| 4–4
| James Wakefield
| Submission (armbar)
| ISCF: Anarchy in August
| 
| align=center| 1
| align=center| N/A
| Atlanta, Georgia, United States
| 
|-
| Loss
| align=center| 3–4
| Ted Govola
| Decision (split)
| Hardcore Fighting Championships 1
| 
| align=center| 3
| align=center| N/A
| Revere, Massachusetts, United States
| 
|-
| Loss
| align=center| 3–3
| Daijiro Matsui
| Decision (unanimous)
| Pride FC: The Best, Vol. 3
| 
| align=center| 2
| align=center| 5:00
| Tokyo, Japan
| 
|-
| Loss
| align=center| 3–2
| Dustin Denes
| Submission (armlock)
| WEFC 1: Bring It On
| 
| align=center| 2
| align=center| 1:42
| Marietta, Georgia, United States
| 
|-
| Win
| align=center| 3–1
| Kelly Williams
| TKO (submission to strikes)
| ISCF: Battle at the Brewery
| 
| align=center| 1
| align=center| 2:54
| Atlanta, Georgia, United States
| 
|-
| Loss
| align=center| 2–1
| Scott Shipman
| Decision (unanimous)
| RSF 7: Animal Instinct
| 
| align=center| 3
| align=center| N/A
| Lakeland, Florida, United States
| 
|-
| Win
| align=center| 2–0
| Butch Bacon
| Decision (unanimous)
| RSF 6: Mayhem in Myers
| 
| align=center| 3
| align=center| 3:00
| Fort Myers, Florida, United States
| 
|-
| Win
| align=center| 1–0
| Ludwig Strydom
| Submission (triangle choke)
| Pride and Honor
| 
| align=center| 2
| align=center| 0:16
| South Africa
|

See also
List of select Jewish mixed martial artists

References

External links

Additional MMA record info from FCFigher.com
Profile at UFC.com
The HardCore Gym
SBG Athens

1976 births
20th-century American Jews
Living people
American male mixed martial artists
Mixed martial artists from New York (state)
Mixed martial artists from Georgia (U.S. state)
Mixed martial artists utilizing boxing
Mixed martial artists utilizing Muay Thai
Mixed martial artists utilizing taekwondo
Mixed martial artists utilizing karate
Mixed martial artists utilizing wrestling
Mixed martial artists utilizing Brazilian jiu-jitsu
Middleweight mixed martial artists
Ultimate Fighting Championship male fighters
American Muay Thai practitioners
American male boxers
American male taekwondo practitioners
American male karateka
American practitioners of Brazilian jiu-jitsu
People awarded a black belt in Brazilian jiu-jitsu
21st-century American Jews